Milton Henry Steengrafe (May 26, 1898 – June 2, 1977), was a Major League Baseball pitcher who played from  and  with the Chicago White Sox. He batted and threw right-handed. Steengrafe had a 1-1 record with a 5.11 ERA, in 16 career games, in his two-year career.

He was born in San Francisco, California and died in Oklahoma City, Oklahoma.

External links

1898 births
1977 deaths
Major League Baseball pitchers
Baseball players from California
Chicago White Sox players